Rafael Kamalov (born 4 September 1997) is a Russian taekwondo practitioner. He won the gold medal in the men's 87 kg event at the 2019 Military World Games.

He won one of the bronze medals in the men's 87 kg event at the 2017 Summer Universiade held in Taipei, Taiwan. He repeated this in the men's 87 kg at the 2019 Summer Universiade held in Naples, Italy.

References

External links 
 

Living people
1997 births
Place of birth missing (living people)
Russian male taekwondo practitioners
Universiade bronze medalists for Russia
Universiade medalists in taekwondo
Medalists at the 2017 Summer Universiade
Medalists at the 2019 Summer Universiade
21st-century Russian people